Miss Beatty's Children is a 1992 English-language Indian drama film directed by Pamela Rooks in a directorial debut, with Jenny Seagrove, Faith Brook and Protima Bedi in lead roles. The film set in 1936 in South India, was based on Pamela Rooks own novel by the same name.

At the 40th National Film Awards, the film won the award for Best Debut Film of a Director and the Best Cinematography.

Plot
In 1936 in South India, Jane, an English schoolteacher comes to Trippuvur to work with Mabel Forster, a Christian missionary, who runs a mission school, and works towards young girls from being sold into temple prostitution. She has Kamla Devi, a senior temple woman as her opponent. Once when Mabel has gone away Jane finds herself trapped in a local controversy. She rescues an Anglo-Indian girl and takes her to Ooty, but back in the town she is accused of kidnapping. However she manages to find help with an American doctor, Alan Chandler. Eventually she adopts Amber, and rescues several more children.

Cast
 Jenny Seagrove as Jane Beatty
 Faith Brook as  Mabel Forster
 Protima Bedi as Kamla Devi
 D. W. Moffett as Alan Chandler
 Barry John
 Emma Sanderson
 Rituraj Singh
 Catherine Stevens
 Cecil Qadir

Bibliography

References

External links
 
 Miss Beatty's Children, Online at CinemasofIndia, NFDC

1992 films
English-language Indian films
Films set in 1936
Films whose cinematographer won the Best Cinematography National Film Award
Films about social issues in India
Indian drama films
Films based on Indian novels
Films set in Tamil Nadu
Films set in the British Raj
Best Debut Feature Film of a Director National Film Award winners
1992 directorial debut films
National Film Development Corporation of India films
1990s English-language films